Cratoxylum formosum is a species of flowering plant in the Hypericaceae family. Its commercial name in timber production is "mampat".

It is a tropical plant found in Brunei, Burma, Cambodia, China, Indonesia, Laos, Malaysia, the Philippines, Singapore, Thailand, and Vietnam. The trees flower when there is dry weather followed by wet weather than dry weather again. It has pink flowers and can be up to 20 meters tall, though they rarely achieve the size required for timber exploitation.

The Catalogue of Life lists the subspecies C. formosum subsp. pruniflorum 

In Laos, Cratoxylum fomosum trees are used:
 for the production of charcoal 
 for their edible young leaves, which can be differentiated as either sour (ສົ້ມ), smooth (ມ່ອນ) or blood-red (ເລືອດ), possibly depending on subspecies (such as sp. prunifolium).

Local names:
 Laotian: ໄມ້ຕີ້ວ 
 Malay: mampat
 Phak tiu
 Vietnamese: thành ngạnh đẹp (subsp. prunifolium : thành ngạnh vàng)

References

formosum
Least concern plants
Trees of Indo-China
Trees of China
Trees of Malesia
Flora of Vietnam
Non-timber forest products
Herbs
Taxonomy articles created by Polbot